Legislative Assembly elections were held in the Indian state of West Bengal in 1987. The election was mainly a clash between the Left Front led by Chief Minister Jyoti Basu and the Indian National Congress(I) led by Prime Minister Rajiv Gandhi. The former held the state government and the latter the national government. The election was won by the Left Front, for the third time in a row.

Contestants

Left Front
The governing Left Front denied tickets to 62 sitting legislators. In many cases CPI(M), the dominant force in the Left Front, was seeking to rejuvenate the legislature and fielded 35 student leaders as new candidates.

The star campaigner of the Left Front was Chief Minister Jyoti Basu of CPI(M), who had pledged to visit all constituencies where CPI(M) had fielded candidates. During the campaign Basu claimed that the Delhi government discriminated against West Bengal in allocation of resources.

Congress(I)
'Natun Bangla' ('New Bengal') was the key slogan of the Congress(I) campaign. The star campaigner of Congress(I) was Prime Minister Rajiv Gandhi, who was flown in from Delhi and toured the state. At the time Gandhi enjoyed significant popularity, especially amongst urban upper-middle class sectors. Gandhi was accompanied by West Bengal Congress(I) chief Priya Ranjan Dasmunsi on the campaign trail. Striking a populist tone, Gandhi promised development in West Bengal and to create a million new jobs.

The Congress(I) campaign, whilst being boosted by Gandhi, suffered from internal dissent in party ranks. Congress(I) heavy-weights Subrata Mukherjee and Soumen Mitra led a revolt against the party leadership. And Pranab Mukherjee had floated his Rashtriya Samajbadi Congress, breaking away from Congress(I).

Gorkhaland issue
Whilst an accord had been struck between Gandhi and Gorkha National Liberation Front leader Subhash Ghisingh ahead of the polls, violence escalated in the Darjeeling hills. In the run-up to the polls, several policemen were killed in the area.

Results
The Left Front won 251 out of 294 seats. It obtained 13,918,403 votes (52.96% of the statewide vote).

Elected members

References

External links
 West Bengal General Legislative Election Results at the Election Commission of India

West Bengal
State Assembly elections in West Bengal
1980s in West Bengal